Sense Magazine was a Los Angeles and Las Vegas based magazine that focused on the culture, entertainment, and fashion of the Los Angeles and Las Vegas lifestyle. The magazine focused on Los Angeles and Las Vegas, with features on San Diego, and other Southern California related cities.

Distribution
Similar to Los Angeles, Vegas, Malibu, Vegas Rated, Venice, 944, Brentwood Magazine, and LA Direct, the publication was distributed across Las Vegas and Los Angeles at boutiques, restaurants, theaters, condos, apartments and many other similar lifestyle businesses.

In the media
SENSE was featured on The Janice Dickinson Modeling Agency Season 3. The magazine hired three female models from the agency (Daria Lukonina, Grasie Mercedes, and Lisa Riddle) for an underwater photo shoot featured in one of their issues.

References

External links
Official SENSE Magazine Website LA
Official SENSE Magazine Website Vegas

Bimonthly magazines published in the United States
Lifestyle magazines published in the United States
Defunct magazines published in the United States
Entertainment magazines published in the United States
Local interest magazines published in the United States
Magazines established in 2007
Magazines disestablished in 2009
Magazines published in Los Angeles